The men's featherweight (57 kilograms) event at the 2002 Asian Games took place from 2 to 13 October 2002 at Masan Gymnasium, Masan, South Korea.

Schedule
All times are Korea Standard Time (UTC+09:00)

Results 
Legend
RSCO — Won by referee stop contest outclassed
WO — Won by walkover

Final

Top half

Bottom half

References

External links
Official website

57